This is a list of caves in Ireland as a whole, including those in Northern Ireland and the Republic of Ireland, as well as information on the largest and deepest caves in Ireland.

Overview

The longest cave system in Ireland is Pollnagollum–Poulelva in County Clare, Republic of Ireland, with at least  of passageways.

Search by region 
 Caves of the Tullybrack and Belmore hills

List of caves 
Caves that lie partly or wholly within Northern Ireland are marked with an asterisk (*).
Mythological caves are marked with a dagger (†).
 Ailwee Cave, County Clare
 Badger Pot, County Fermanagh*
 Boho Caves, County Fermanagh*
 Cloyne Cave, County Cork
 Crag Cave, County Kerry
 Dunmore Cave, County Kilkenny
 Fintan's Grave, County Tipperary†
Kelly's Cave, County Mayo
 Killavullen Caves, County Cork
 Marble Arch Caves, County Fermanagh*
 Mitchelstown Cave, County Tipperary
 Noon's Hole, County Fermanagh*
 Pol an Ionain, County Clare
 Pollatoomary, County Mayo
 Pollnagollum–Poulelva, County Clare
 Portbraddon Cave, County Antrim*
 Shannon Cave, County Cavan and County Fermanagh*

See also
Geography of Ireland
List of caves
:Category:Caves of Ireland

External links 

 UK Caves – UK and Ireland cave listing

 
Ireland
Caves